The Bank of Hope LPGA Match Play is a women's professional golf tournament on the LPGA Tour in Las Vegas, Nevada. It debuted on the LPGA Tour in 2021 at the Shadow Creek Golf Course as the only match play tournament on the schedule.

The title sponsor of the tournament is Bank of Hope, a Los Angeles-based Asian-American bank in the United States. Bank of Hope previously sponsored the LPGA Founders Cup from 2017 to 2019.

This is the first match play tournament on the LPGA Tour since the Lorena Ochoa Invitational in 2017.

Ally Ewing won the inaugural event.

Tournament names
2021 – present: Bank of Hope LPGA Match-Play

Winners

References

External links

Coverage on the LPGA Tour's official site
Shadow Creek Golf Course

LPGA Tour events
Golf in Nevada
Women's sports in Nevada